J. australis  may refer to:
 Juania australis, a flowering plant species found only in Chile
 Juglans australis, the Nogal Criollo, a plant species found in Argentina and Bolivia

See also
 Australis (disambiguation)